The sailing competition at the 2014 Central American and Caribbean Games was held in Veracruz, Mexico.

The tournament was scheduled to be held from 23–28 November at Camino Real Beach, Veramar Marina and Anton Lizardo Herioic Navy School.

Medal summary

Men's events

Women's events

Open events

Medal table

References

External links
 

2014 Central American and Caribbean Games events
2014 in sailing
2014
Sailing competitions in Mexico